Hakaona (Hakawona, Havakona) is a Bantu language of Angola and Namibia. Until perhaps Anita Pfouts (2003), it was considered a dialect of Herero.

Maho (2009) sets up a Northwest Herero language, which includes Zimba; from the map, it would appear to include Himba and Hakaona as well.

Notes

Herero language
Languages of Angola
Languages of Namibia